Antonio Coma (1560–1629) was an Italian composer.  He was born in Cento, Ferrara, and came from a notable family of musicians. He may be the subject of a painting attributed to Guercino.

Works, editions, recordings
 Sacrae Cantiones op.4 (Bologna, 1614) Claudio Cavina, Paolo Fanciullacci, Andrea Favari, Gianluca Ferrarini, Sergio Foresti. Dynamic. 1999

References

1560 births
1629 deaths
Musicians from Ferrara